Events in the year 1958 in Germany.

Incumbents
President –  Theodor Heuss 
Chancellor –  Konrad Adenauer

Events 
 January 20 - Germany in the Eurovision Song Contest 1958
 June 27 - July 8 - 8th Berlin International Film Festival
 November 16 - East German general election, 1958

Science 
 Date unknown - The Mössbauer effect, or recoilless nuclear resonance fluorescence, is a physical phenomenon discovered by Rudolf Mössbauer in 1958.

Births
January 24 - Frank Ullrich, biathlete
January 25 - Jürgen Hingsen, decathlete
February 12 - Gero Storjohann, politician (died 2023)
February 17 - Claudia Schoppmann, historian and writer 
March 20 - Stefan Keil, diplomat (died 2021)
March 21 - Marlies Göhr, athlete
March 24
 Roland Koch, politician
 Mathias Richling, German actor, author, comedian and cabaret artist
March 31 - Dietmar Bartsch, politician
March 31 - Sylvester Groth, actor
April 2 - Olaf Prenzler, sprinter
April 26 - Ingolf Lück, actor
May 7 - Christine Lieberknecht, politician
May 19 - Dieter Reiter, politician
May 21 - Sabine Bischoff, fencer	
May 23 - Thomas Reiter, astronaut
June 3 - Margot Käßmann, Lutheran theologian, who was Landesbischöfin (bishop) of the Evangelical-Lutheran Church of Hanover in Germany	
June 6 - Rudi Fink, boxer
June 14 - Olaf Scholz, politician
June 16 - Ulrike Tauber, swimmer
June 18 - Peter Altmaier, politician	
June 29 - Dieter Althaus, politician
July 25 - Karlheinz Förster, footballer
July 27 - Barbara Rudnik, actress (died 2009)
July 15 - Jörg Kachelmann Swiss presenter in the meteorological field and victim of false rape accusations
July 27 - Margarethe Schreinemakers, television presenter and talk show host
August 5 - Ulla Salzgeber, equestrian
September 1 - Dagmar Manzel, actress
September 6 - Amelie Fried, writer	
September 26 - Rudi Cerne, figure skater
September 29 - Tom Buhrow, journalist
October 8 - Ursula von der Leyen, politician
October 14 - Peter Kloeppel, journalist
October 23 - Axel Krause, painter and graphic artist
October 25 - Kornelia Ender, swimmer
November 9 - Eva Herman, author and television presenter
December 5 - Annette Harnack, high jumper
December 5 - Martin Schaudt, equestrian
December 10 - Annelore Zinke, gymnast
December 11 - Dominic Raacke, actor
December 15 - Stephan Weil, politician	
December 21 - Tom Enders, businessman	
December 25 - Alexander, Prince of Schaumburg-Lippe, nobleman

Deaths
January 9 - Karl Reinhardt, German philologist (born 1886)
January 27 - Prince Oskar of Prussia, German nobleman (born 1888)
January 30 - Ernst Heinkel, German aircraft designer (born 1888)
February 22 - Theo Harych, German writer (born 1903)
March 3 - Wilhelm Zaisser, German politician (born 1893)
March 21 - Hans Ehrenberg, German theologian (born 1883)
April 6 - Reinhold Schneider, German poet (born 1903)
June 20 - Kurt Alder, German chemist (born 1902)
June 29 - Karl Arnold, German politician (born 1901)
June 30 - Walther Schreiber, German politician (born 1884)
July 26 - Siegfried Passarge, German geographer (born 1866)
August 25 - Leo Blech, German composer and conductor (born 1871)
September 10 - Franz Wessel, German judge (born 1903)
September 15 — Ferdinand Schumann-Heink, German actor (born 1893)
October 11 - Johannes R. Becher, German politician, poet and novelist (born 1891)
October 19 - Josef Wintrich, German judge (born 1891)
October 23 - Erich Köhler, German politician (born 1892)
October 24 - Carl-Hans Graf von Hardenberg, German politician and landowner (born 1891)
November 19 - Hans Heinrich von Twardowski (born 1898)
December 21 - Lion Feuchtwanger, German novelist (born 1884)

See also
1958 in German television

References

 
1950s in Germany
Years of the 20th century in Germany
Germany
Germany